The 2021 St. Patrick's Day Slam was the inaugural St. Patrick's Day Slam  professional wrestling television special produced by All Elite Wrestling (AEW). The event took place on March 11, 2021, but aired on tape delay on March 17 at Daily's Place in Jacksonville, Florida. It was broadcast on TNT as a special episode of AEW's weekly television program, Dynamite.

Production

Storylines
St. Patrick's Day Slam featured professional wrestling matches that involved different wrestlers from pre-existing scripted feuds and storylines. Wrestlers portrayed heroes, villains, or less distinguishable characters in scripted events that built tension and culminated in a wrestling match or series of matches. Storylines were produced on AEW's weekly television program, Dynamite, the supplementary online streaming shows, Dark and Elevation, and The Young Bucks' YouTube series Being The Elite.

Background
At the event, Christian Cage addressed the reason behind his arrival in AEW.

Through a working relationship with Impact Wrestling this event featured the Impact World Tag Team Champions The Good Brothers as they took on All Elite Wrestling's Jon Moxley and Eddie Kingston.

In the main event, Thunder Rosa faced off against Britt Baker in an unsanctioned Lights Out match, making it the first time an AEW event was headlined by female wrestlers.

Results

See also
2021 in professional wrestling

References

External links
All Elite Wrestling Official website

2021 American television episodes
All Elite Wrestling shows
Events in Jacksonville, Florida
March 2021 events in the United States
Professional wrestling in Florida
2021 in professional wrestling
Holidays themed professional wrestling events